The 2022 OFC Champions League (officially known as OFC Champions League 2022) was the 21st edition of the Oceanian Club Championship, Oceania's premier club football tournament organized by the Oceania Football Confederation (OFC), and the 16th season under the current OFC Champions League name.

In the final, Auckland City defeated Vénus 3–0 for their tenth title. Hienghène Sport, having won the title in 2019, were the title holders, since the 2020 and 2021 editions were cancelled due to border closures throughout the Pacific caused by the COVID-19 pandemic and the titles were not awarded, but were eliminated by Vénus in the semi-finals.

Teams

A total of 14 teams from 8 OFC member associations are eligible to enter the competition. Due to the COVID-19 pandemic, the format of the competition was changed, with all teams entering a qualifying stage consisting of a qualifying tournament and national play-offs, in order to keep travel to a minimum:
The six developed associations (Fiji, New Caledonia, Papua New Guinea, Solomon Islands, Tahiti, Vanuatu) are awarded two berths each in the national play-offs, which are either played in a two-legged format or as a single match in their own country between the two teams from each association, with the six winners advancing to the final tournament.
As the qualifying stages were cancelled due to travel restrictions and logistic challenges, OFC nominated Nikao Sokattak (Cook Islands) based on previous results.

Schedule
On 4 March 2021, the OFC announced that the qualifying stage, which would have been played in Tonga between 16 and 22 October 2021, had been postponed to early 2022 due to the COVID-19 pandemic. On 4 June 2021, the OFC announced that the tournament would be moved from its traditional slot at the beginning of the year to August, and a revised format for the event would be presented at the next OFC Executive Committee meeting. On 8 October 2021, the OFC announced the new format of the competition.

Qualifying stage

National playoffs
On 13 May 2022, OFC announced that 6 sets of national playoffs would take place to determine which side from those nations would take part in this year's Champions League. New Zealand Football announced that they had nominated Auckland City as their sole participant taking part in the competition.

|}

Hienghène Sport won 4–3 on aggregate.

Rewa won 5–1 on aggregate.

Galaxy won 5–0 on aggregate.

3–3 on aggregate. Central Coast won 4–2 on penalties

Group stage

The group stage was held in Auckland, New Zealand on 4-11 August 2022.
The four teams in each group played each other on a round-robin basis at a centralised venue, Ngahue Reserve, Auckland. The winners and runners-up of each group advanced to the semi-finals of the knockout stage.

All of the qualified teams for the group stage are as follows:

 Auckland City
 Nikao Sokattak
 Rewa
 Hienghène Sport
 Vénus
 Galaxy
 Central Coast
 Lae City

Group A

Group B

Knockout stage

Bracket

Semi-finals

Final

Statistics
Statistics exclude national play-off rounds.

Top goalscorers

References

External links
News > OFC Champions League , oceaniafootball.com

2022
1
Association football events postponed due to the COVID-19 pandemic